Herman Clark Mayfield (October 11, 1941 – May 28, 1977) was an American football player and coach. He served as the head football coach at Jacksonville State University in Jacksonville, Alabama from 1974 to 1976, compiling a record of 22–11.

As a player at the University of Kentucky in 1962, Mayfield's field goal clinched a victory against Tennessee in the season's final game.  He died on May 28, 1977 in the Beverly Hills Supper Club fire in Southgate, Kentucky.

Head coaching record

College

References

External links
 

1941 births
1977 deaths
American football halfbacks
American football placekickers
Kentucky Wildcats football players
Jacksonville State Gamecocks football coaches
High school football coaches in Kentucky
People from Harlan County, Kentucky
Players of American football from Kentucky
Deaths from fire in the United States